Semic may refer to:

 Semic Comics, a French comic book publisher
 Semic Press, a Swedish publishing company
 Semič, a settlement in southeastern Slovenia
 Semić, a village in the municipality of Lupoglav, in Istria County, Croatia
 Semantic Interoperability Centre Europe (SEMIC.EU)